Neta Riskin (born 28 October 1976) is an Israeli actress and journalist, best known for her role as Giti Weiss in the series Shtisel.

Riskin coached Israeli-born American actress Natalie Portman to speak Hebrew with an Israeli accent for A Tale of Love and Darkness.

Riskin was born in Tel Aviv, Israel, to secular Jewish architect parents. Her mother was born in Israel. Her father, a Holocaust survivor, was born in Lithuania. Her grandfather, Asher Gliberman, was an Israeli architect who immigrated from Belarus.

Filmography

Films
 A Tale of Love and Darkness (2015) as Haya
 Norman: The Moderate Rise and Tragic Fall of a New York Fixer (2016) as Hannah
 Damascus Cover (2017) as Yael
 Longing (2017) as Yael
 Shelter (2018) as Naomi

Television
 The Gordin Cell (2012-2015) as Nati Ganot/Nathalia Gordin
 Shtisel (2013–2021) as Giti Weiss
 Der Tel-Aviv-Krimi (2016) as Ronit Levi
 False Flag (2018-2019) as Anat Kedmi
 Very Important Person (2019) as Elie Shine
 The Spy (2019) as Tova

References

External links

Living people
People from Tel Aviv
Israeli film actresses
Israeli television actresses
1976 births
Israeli people of Belarusian-Jewish descent
Israeli people of Lithuanian-Jewish descent
Israeli Ashkenazi Jews
21st-century Israeli actresses